The 2004 European Promotion Cup for Women was the eighth edition of the basketball European Promotion Cup for Women, today known as FIBA Women's European Championship for Small Countries. The tournament took place in Andorra la Vella, Andorra, from 26 to 31 July 2004. Iceland women's national basketball team won the tournament for the second time.

Participating teams

First round
In the first round, the teams were drawn into two groups of five. The winners of each group advance to the final, the other teams will play their respective classification matches.

Group A

Group B

9th place match

7th place match

5th place match

3rd place match

Final

Final standings

References

FIBA Women's European Championship for Small Countries
Promotion Cup
International sports competitions hosted by Andorra
Basketball in Andorra
2004 in Andorran sport
European Promotion Cup for Women